The 11th World Cup season began in December 1976 in France and concluded in March 1977 in Spain.  Ingemar Stenmark of Sweden won his second of three consecutive men's overall titles. Rosi Mittermaier, the defending women's overall champion, retired after the 1976 season, but Annemarie Moser-Pröll, who had won the previous five overall titles, returned from her 1976 sabbatical.  However, Lise-Marie Morerod of Switzerland won the women's overall title.

No individual championship was awarded in the Combined discipline, even though both men and women held three combined events, the same as the prior year.  The combined discipline championship would not return until 1980.

Calendar

Men

Ladies

Men

Overall 

The Men's Overall World Cup 1976/77 was most likely also divided into two periods, but no racer had a point deduction.

Downhill 

In Men's Downhill World Cup 1976/77 the best 5 results count. Franz Klammer won 5 races in a row and won the cup with maximum points. Together with the last 4 downhill races last season 1975/76, he won 9 downhill races in a row, and Klammer won his third Downhill World Cup in a row. Austrian skiers won 9 races out of 10.

Giant Slalom 

In Men's Giant Slalom World Cup 1976/77 the best 5 results count. Due to the tiebreak rules then in effect, Ingemar Stenmark failed to win his third Giant Slalom World Cup in a row, as the reigning Olympic Champion Heini Hemmi, who scored the same number of retained points (115), achieved the better sixth result throughout the season in that event (3rd place at Sun Valley).

Slalom 

In Men's Slalom World Cup 1976/77 the best 5 results count. Ingemar Stenmark won five races in a row and won the cup with maximum points. He won seven races out of ten and won his third Slalom World Cup in a row!

Combined 

After the first ever Combined World Cup 1975/76, in this season 1976/77 there were no special discipline world cup for Combined awarded. All three results only count for the Overall World Cup.

Ladies

Overall 

The Women's Overall World Cup 1976/77 was divided into two periods. From the first 16 races the best 8 results count and from the last 11 races the best 7 results count. Six racers had a point deduction.

Downhill 

In Women's Downhill World Cup 1976/77 the best 5 results count. Austrian skiers won 7 races out of 8.

Giant Slalom 

In Women's Giant Slalom World Cup 1976/77 the best 5 results count. Lise-Marie Morerod won 5 races and won the cup with maximum points.

Slalom 

In Women's Slalom World Cup 1976/77 the best 5 results count.

Combined 

After the first ever Combined World Cup 1975/76, in this season 1976/77 there were no special discipline world cup for Combined awarded. All three results only count for the Overall World Cup.

Nations Cup

Overall

Men

Ladies

References

External links
FIS-ski.com - World Cup standings - 1977
1977 World Cup at SVT's open archive 

1976-77
1976 in alpine skiing
1977 in alpine skiing